Solomon Grundy was an American Grunge band from Ellensburg, Washington, formed in 1989 by Screaming Trees bassist Van Conner.

History 
The band was formed by Conner as a side project outside of his full-time band Screaming Trees. In Solomon Grundy he performed lead vocals and played guitar, rather than playing bass guitar as with Screaming Trees. The band also included guitarist Lee McCullough, bassist Jim King, and drummer Sean Hollister. They released an album in 1990; it was originally titled Stone Soup and Other Stories but this was later changed to simply Solomon Grundy. The project ended in 1990 when Screaming Trees signed a major label deal, and Conner dedicated himself to that band's recording and touring schedule.

Members
Van Conner - vocals, guitar
Lee McCullough - guitar
Jim King - bass
Sean Hollister - drums

Discography
Solomon Grundy (1990)

References

American psychedelic rock music groups
Musical groups from Washington (state)
Musical groups established in 1989
Musical groups disestablished in 1990